Amba Bongo is a writer and advocate for refugees from the Democratic Republic of the Congo-Kinshasa. She mainly works with vulnerable French African women seeking to settle in the United Kingdom. Amba writes novels, poems and short stories

Her first novel Une femme en exil  came out in 2000. A second book, Cécilia, is coming out soon after that. She currently lives in London.

External links
University of West Australia site
Profile on page 7

Democratic Republic of the Congo poets
Living people
Democratic Republic of the Congo refugees
English people of Democratic Republic of the Congo descent
Democratic Republic of the Congo short story writers
Democratic Republic of the Congo novelists
Democratic Republic of the Congo women writers
Democratic Republic of the Congo women short story writers
Women novelists
Democratic Republic of the Congo women poets
Year of birth missing (living people)